1995 Yokohama Flügels season

Review and events

League results summary

League results by round

Competitions

Domestic results

J.League

Emperor's Cup

International results

Asian Super Cup

Asian Cup Winners' Cup

Player statistics

 † player(s) joined the team after the opening of this season.

Transfers

In:

Out:

Transfers during the season

In
 Rodrigo (from Paraná Clube on April)
 Junji Koizumi (from Yokohama Marinos)
山竹 操 (from Shizuoka Gakuen Senior High School)

Out
 Masahiko Nakagawa (to Yokohama Marinos)

Awards
none

References

Other pages
 J. League official site
 Yokohama F. Marinos official web site

Yokohama Flugels
Yokohama Flügels seasons